Weekend is a Polish band. Their music is on the border of the disco polo and dance genres.

Discography

Albums

Singles

Other charted songs

References

External links 
 

Musical groups established in 2000
Polish pop music groups
Disco groups
Polish dance music groups
2000 establishments in Poland